Samir Ghising, better known by his stage name VTEN, is a Nepalese rapper and actor. He is widely regarded as one of the prominent figure of Nepalese hip hop. He started gaining popularity after release of his song "Churot" in 2016.His songs like ''Simsime Pani", "Paara", "Hami Yestai ta honi bro", "Yatra", "Haalkhabar", "Kaatha" etc are major hits.

Early life 
Ghising was born in Rautahat. Ghising worked as a carpenter with his father, learning to make cupboards, doors, and windows from wood. As a teenager, Ghising moved to Kathmandu to study in high school, and also started painting Thankas with his uncle. In interviews, Ghising has said he became passionate about rapping while painting Thankas but began to have difficulty juggling that job with his expanding rap career. Ghising spent most of his pre-fame days living with his friends and writing rap songs. He is said to have completed his high school(+2) and has not continued his education thereafter.

Career 
He has worked with various popular artists such as Girish Khatiwada. Ghising made his way into the rap industry by impressing many with his talent in rapping. His songs have been applauded for their realism, relatability to the struggle of young people in Nepal, and potent and exceptional self-expression of feelings. He is the first Nepali solo artist to hit 1 million subscribers on YouTube. He gained popularity from his hit lists such as Churot, Hami Yastai ta Honi Bro, Sim Sime Pani, Himmat, Cypher, Kathaa, Manche Khattam and so on.

Tours
Ghising has toured in South Korea, Australia, Japan, UK, UAE, Bhutan, India (Sikkim,Kalimpong) , Hong Kong, Qatar, and Thailand.

Discography

Studio albums 
Superstar (2020)
Bad Bad Bad (2023) (Yet to be released)

EPs 
Psycho EP (2019)

Singles

Promotional track

References

External links 
 

Living people
Male rappers
21st-century Nepalese male singers
People from Rautahat District
Nepalese hip hop singers
Nepali-language lyricists
1996 births
Nepalese painters
21st-century Nepalese painters
Tamang people